City of Santa Clarita Transit is a local bus service, administered by the City's transit division, that serves the City of Santa Clarita, California and nearby surrounding unincorporated areas. Daily operations and maintenance of the fleet are under contract with MV Transportation. City of Santa Clarita Transit routes connect with services operated by Metro and Metrolink.

The Los Angeles County Department of Public Works pays City of Santa Clarita Transit to provide fixed route and Dial-A-Ride services in some unincorporated areas of Los Angeles County that are near the city limits of Santa Clarita. These areas include the communities of Castaic, Stevenson Ranch, Sunset Pointe, Val Verde, and as far south as the Olive View-UCLA Medical Center.

History 

The City of Santa Clarita assumed responsibility for local transit in 1991 from Los Angeles County, which had developed an embryonic transit network.  A small City staff provides supervision over a contract operator. Over time, the local fixed route network and dial-a-ride service was expanded. Under City management, a number of new regional express services to various points in the San Fernando Valley, West Los Angeles, Antelope Valley, and downtown Los Angeles were added or improved.

In mid-2007 Santa Clarita Transit underwent a branding overhaul. The agency was renamed "City of Santa Clarita Transit" and buses received a new green and blue livery which reflect the colors of the city logo. The livery debuted in August 2007 on 2 brand new  articulated buses. Also receiving an overhaul are the city's bus stops through a $2-million dollar Bus Stop Improvement Program.  This included replacing 51 Clear Channel advertising shelters, benches, and trash cans.  In addition, 40 additional stops will receive new non-advertising shelters, as well as a number of stops receiving new non-advertisement benches. An element of public art will be added to approximately 15 bus stops. The program's purpose is threefold, bus stops will become more uniform in look and features, the advertisement on benches will be eliminated, and public art will have a large expansion.  The overhauls are major parts of the city's efforts to make transit more attractive to citizens. 

Starting in 2010, Santa Clarita Transit began Summer Beach bus service to Santa Monica, from Canyon Country, and Newhall. They are separated into two routes servicing each destination to Santa Monica. These services only operate during the summer.

Transfer Stations 
McBean Regional Transit Center
Santa Clarita station
Newhall station
Via Princessa station
Vista Canyon Multi-Modal Center (2023)

Transit Maintenance Facility 
City of Santa Clarita Transit is housed in the City's Transit Maintenance Facility.  The facility has been gold LEED certified.

Fixed-route Service

Local Routes

Station Link Service 
Station Link service provides service from the Santa Clarita Metrolink station to local places of employment within the Santa Clarita Valley. Station Link service operates on weekdays peak periods (6-9am, 4-6pm) only except route 501, which as of February 2023, makes morning and afternoon trips excluding midday even on Saturdays and Sundays, select holidays included.

Supplemental School Day Service 
Supplemental School Day Service routes (also known as Tripper Service), provide service to and from local Junior High and High Schools from residential areas. Supplemental School Day Service routes are numbered in the 600's. This service is only operated on weekdays when schools are in session. Trips are timed with school bell schedule.

Routes include:
Route 620 – Arroyo Seco Jr. High School & Saugus High School
Route 621 – Arroyo Seco Jr. High School & Saugus High School
Route 622 – Rio Norte Jr. High School
Route 623 – Rio Norte Jr. High School
Route 624 – Valencia High School
Route 626 – La Mesa Jr. High School
Route 627 – La Mesa Jr. High School
Route 628 – Golden Valley High School
Route 629 – Golden Valley High School
Route 630 – Golden Valley High School & Bowman High School
Route 632 – Canyon High School
Route 633 – Saugus High School
Route 634 – Rancho Pico Jr. High School & West Ranch High School
Route 636 – Valencia High School & West Ranch High School
Route 637 – Arroyo Seco Jr. High School
Route 638 – Arroyo Seco Jr. High School & Saugus High School
Route 639 - Saugus High School
Route 640 – Arroyo Seco Jr. High School & Saugus High School
Route 641 – Placerita Jr. High School & Hart High School
Route 642 – Bowman High School & Canyon High School & La Mesa Jr. High School
Route 643 – Arroyo Seco Jr. High School & Saugus High School
Route 644 – La Mesa Jr. High School

Commuter Express Service 
Commuter Express provides service to and from to major places of employment outside of the Santa Clarita Valley (Routes 796-799), and also provides service from areas outside of the Santa Clarita Valley to major places of employment inside the Santa Clarita Valley (Routes 791-794). All Commuter Express Routes run on weekdays only, except for Route 757, which runs seven days a week.

Fares 
Exact cash fare is required. Under 5, up to 3 per fare-paying rider, ride for free. Passes are stored on reusable Transit Access Pass (TAP) cards that cost $2 each. Customers can also store cash-value on their TAP card that can be used with any Los Angeles county transit agency that accepts TAP. Since February 2018 fares are available for purchase on the Token Transit mobile ticketing app.

The following table shows City of Santa Clarita Transit fares, effective January 1, 2020:

Notes:
TAP card required.
The EZ transit pass is a monthly pass good for local travel on 21 different public transit carriers throughout the Greater Los Angeles region.
Senior discount eligibility starts at age 62 for EZ transit pass.

Fleet 
The City of Santa Clarita transit fleet consists of 87 Standard Vehicles and 33 Paratransit vehicles as of April 2022.

On November 6, 2017, Bus 102 was totalled in a fatal multi-vehicle accident on Sierra Highway.

Active

References

External links 

City of Santa Clarita Transit Website

Public transportation in Los Angeles County, California
Bus transportation in California
1991 establishments in California
Transit authorities with natural gas buses
Santa Clarita, California